Adrian Kennedy may refer to:

 Adrian Kennedy (journalist), Irish columnist and radio presenter
 Adrian Kennedy (Hollyoaks), character in Hollyoaks